Mount Matheson, at , is the highest point in East Sooke, British Columbia. From the top there are panoramic views from Cape Flattery to Mount Baker. The bedrock is Eocene-era basalt.

References

Mountains of British Columbia under 1000 metres
Greater Victoria
Juan de Fuca region